Cascades is a suburb of Hobart, Tasmania, Australia.  It is immediately west of the city centre, in the foothills of Mount Wellington.  It is the location of the Cascade Brewery. The suburb is between South Hobart and Fern Tree; and incorporates residential areas on Strickland Avenue and Huon Road.

Sources
(Google Maps)